Louis Beaubien (July 27, 1837 – July 19, 1915) was a Canadian politician.

Early life 
Born in Montreal, Lower Canada, the son of Pierre Beaubien, a physician and politician, and Marie-Justine Casgrain, he was one of the founders of Outremont.

Political career 
In 1867, he was elected to the Legislative Assembly of Quebec in the riding of Hochelaga. He was also elected to the House of Commons of Canada as the Conservative candidate for the Quebec riding of Hochelaga in the 1872 federal election. He resigned once it was no longer allowed to hold both federal and provincial offices.

He was re-elected in 1875, 1878, and acclaimed in 1881. He was Speaker of the Legislative Assembly from 1876 to 1878. He did not run in the 1886 election. In 1891, he was named commissioner of agriculture and colonization in the cabinet of Charles Boucher de Boucherville.

Beaubien was acclaimed in the 1892 election. He would remain in this post in the cabinets of Louis-Olivier Taillon and Edmund James Flynn. He was defeated in the 1897 election.

Personal life 
In 1882, he was the 30th President of the Saint-Jean-Baptiste Society of Montreal. In 1864, he married Suzanne Lauretta Stuart. They had four sons and four daughters, including Charles-Philippe Beaubien, the Canadian senator.

He is the grandfather of Louis-Philippe Beaubien, also a Canadian senator. He was a cousin of Charles Eusèbe Casgrain and, his son, Philippe Baby Casgrain. Beaubien died in 1915 and is buried in the Notre Dame des Neiges Cemetery.

Electoral history

See also 

 1st Canadian Parliament
2nd Canadian Parliament
3rd Canadian Parliament
4th Canadian Parliament
5th Canadian Parliament
6th Canadian Parliament
7th Canadian Parliament
8th Canadian Parliament

References
Louis Beaubien and family fonds at Library and Archives Canada.
 
 
 

1837 births
1915 deaths
Conservative Party of Canada (1867–1942) MPs
Conservative Party of Quebec MNAs
Presidents of the National Assembly of Quebec
Members of the House of Commons of Canada from Quebec
Politicians from Montreal
Presidents of the Saint-Jean-Baptiste Society of Montreal
Burials at Notre Dame des Neiges Cemetery